Moustapha Ngae A-Bissene (born 21 September 1998) is a Cameroonian professional footballer who plays as a forward for Sacachispas.

Career
A-Bissene began his career in Cameroon in the lower divisions, attracting interest from other countries though injury halted any potential move. He moved to Argentina with Huracán in 2017, following in the footsteps of his brother. A-Bissene, via a Tigre trial, moved to Sacachispas in 2018. He made his debut on 4 February against Defensores de Belgrano, coming off the bench in Primera B Metropolitana to replace Lucas Fernández in a 2–1 loss. A-Bissene was substituted on ten more times across 2017–18 and 2018–19, prior to his first start arriving on 24 March 2019 versus Talleres; though he was sent off after fifty-six minutes.

A-Bissene scored his first senior goal on 28 September, as he netted the winning goal in a league victory over Flandria.

Personal life
A-Bissene's brother, Arouna Dang Bissene, is also a footballer. Whilst with Sacachispas, A-Bissene lived with fellow Cameroonian footballer Stephane Nwatsock.

Career statistics
.

References

External links

1998 births
Living people
Footballers from Yaoundé
Cameroonian footballers
Association football forwards
Cameroonian expatriate footballers
Expatriate footballers in Argentina
Cameroonian expatriate sportspeople in Argentina
Primera B Metropolitana players
Sacachispas Fútbol Club players